Michael or Mike Ross may refer to:

Politics
 Mike Ross (politician) (born 1961), former United States Representative from Arkansas's 4th congressional district
 Michael Ross (Washington politician) (1941–2007), member of the Washington House of Representatives
 Michael P. Ross (born 1972), city council member, Boston, Massachusetts, 2000–2014

Sports
 Mike Ross (rugby union) (born 1979), Leinster rugby union player
 Michael Ross (cricketer) (born 1998), Italian cricketer
 Michael Ross (footballer) (born 1991), Australian rules footballer for Essendon in the Australian Football League
 Michael Ross (rugby league), Australian rugby league player

Other
 Mike Ross (artist), American sculptor
 Michael Ross (artist) (born 1954), American artist
 Michael Ross (screenwriter) (1919–2009), American screenwriter
 Michael Bruce Ross (1959–2005), American convicted serial killer
 Michael Ross (Home and Away), fictional character from the television series Home and Away
 Mike Ross (Suits), a fictional character from the television series Suits
 Michael Ross (Mossad officer) (born 1965), Canadian-Israeli expert on intelligence and a former Mossad officer
 Mike Ross (radio host) (born 1973), Canadian radio host
 I. Michael Ross, American innovator and founder of pseudospectral optimal control theory
 Michael Ross, American record producer and partner in hip hop label Delicious Vinyl
 Michael Ross, keyboard player and producer with Australian musical duo Electric Fields

See also